The 14701 /14702 Amrapur Aravali Express is a mail/express train belonging to Indian Railways that runs between  and  in India. It operates as train number 14701 from  Shri Ganganagar to Bandra Terminus in DN direction and as train number 14702 in the UP direction. It is named after Amarapur Durbar famous temple in Jaipur and Aravalli Range of mountains that stretches across Gujarat, Rajasthan, Haryana & Delhi. The previous train number was 19708/19707 in DN and UP direction.

Till 7 November 2019 it was running between Jaipur Junction and Bandra Terminus.From 8 November 2019 onwards, the origin of train was shifted from Jaipur Junction to Shri Ganganagar Junction for providing direct rail connectivity to Shri Ganganagar with Jaipur and Mumbai.

Coaches

The 14701/14702 Amarapur Aravali Express presently has 2 AC 2 tier, 3 AC 3 tier, 12 Sleeper class, 4 General Unreserved, 2 Seating cum Luggage Rake coaches & 1 pantry car.

As with most train services in India, coach composition may be amended at the discretion of Indian Railways depending on demand.

Service

As the average speed of the train is below , its fare does not include a Superfast surcharge.

Important Halts 

.

Schedule

Traction

Prior to Western Railway switching to the AC traction, it would be hauled by a WCAM-1 engine until  after which a WDP-4 from the Bhagat Ki Kothi shed until .

Since Western Railway switched over to AC traction in February 2012, it is now hauled by a WAP-4E / WAP-5 from the Vadodara shed until  after which a WDP-4D from the Bhagat Ki Kothi shed takes over until Shri Ganganagar Junction.

Direction reversal
The train reverses its direction 3 times:
 
 
 .

References

External links 

Named passenger trains of India
Rail transport in Maharashtra
Rail transport in Gujarat
Rail transport in Rajasthan
Transport in Mumbai
Transport in Sri Ganganagar